Fu Jen Catholic University (FJU, FJCU or Fu Jen;  or ) is a private Catholic university in Xinzhuang, New Taipei City, Taiwan. The university was founded in 1925 in Beijing at the request of Pope Pius XI and re-established in Taiwan in 1961 at the request of Pope John XXIII, its name means "assistance" and "benevolence". Fu Jen has since grown to comprise twelve colleges and schools, among which are several Taiwan's first or only academic units, such as Italian language, info-management, museology, religious studies, philosophy as well as hosts the earliest A&HCI journal in the whole country. The campus is served by Fu Jen University Station, Taiwan's first metro station named after a university.

Fu Jen is the oldest Catholic and Jesuit-affiliated institution of higher education in the Sinophone world, under the direct authority of the Congregation for Catholic Education of the Holy See. It is also a non-state actor of Track II diplomacy in the Holy See–Taiwan relations. Therefore, Fu Jen has special importance internationally and is known for its strong ties with the Roman Curia. In the past nearly one hundred years of history, the Benedictine, the Verbites, and the Jesuits from all over the world have participated in the management of the university.

The university has been ranked as top 3 catholic university in Asia, top 300 by Times Higher Education Impact Ranking, top 100 in theology and top 500 in humanities and medicine by QS World University Rankings, it has the nation's first business school there with AACSB accreditation and also the medical college was the earliest to promote PBL as pedagogy for medical education, furthermore, the transnational joint master's program "MGEM" was ranked 19th globally by Financial Times in 2020. Fu Jen is Taiwan's 4th most popular university, 5th most impact university, and 5th best ranked business school. Fu Jen alumni include the Premier Lin Chuan, former First Lady of China Wang Guangmei, a number of politicians represented in the Legislative Yuan and professors at various world-class institutions.

Fu Jen is home to the University Mobility in Asia and the Pacific, also a member of Beta Gamma Sigma, the ACUCA, the AWS Educate & AWS Academy, and the IFCU. Fu Jen founded the Alliance of Asian Liberal Arts Universities together with the UTokyo, Waseda, Peking and others. The university has many collaborative institutions and exchange programs with top universities in G8 countries, such as Stanford, Oxford, and Angelicum. In addition, Fu Jen has established sister-school relationships with more than 435 universities worldwide that including UC Berkeley, Tohoku, Georgetown, Notre Dame, and C9 League universities.

History

Early history

The institution was originally established in Beijing in 1925 by the Benedictines of St. Vincent Archabbey in Latrobe, Pennsylvania, at the request of the Holy See, with archabbot Aurelius Stehle serving as chancellor. Fu Jen, then commonly known as the Catholic University of Peking, was itself a successor to the Fu Jen Academy, which was created through the efforts of Catholic scholars Ma Xiangbo and Ying Lianzhi. The university's first president (1925–1927) was the American missionary George Barry O'Toole, OSB. He was succeeded by Chen Yuan, a Chinese Protestant and renowned historian, who remained university president until the school's forced closure by the Chinese Communist government in 1952.

In 1933 the Benedictines in the United States, in the midst of the Great Depression, were no longer able to sustain Fu Jen's mission. Administration of the university passed to the Society of the Divine Word in Germany. Its affiliation with Germany, an ally of Imperial Japan, helped protect university personnel from extreme brutality inflicted elsewhere by occupying Imperial Japanese soldiers during the Sino-Japanese War (1937–1945).

After World War II
In August 1945, China repelled the Imperial Japan and won the World War II. The Nationalist Government made an exception to ratify Fu Jen students' status during the occupation of Beijing. Since the development of the university has not been interrupted by the war, its scientific strength has become China's top. Well-known scientists such as Chien Shih-Liang taught at Fu Jen, and graduates such as Lee C. Teng and Wang Guangmei will become world celebrities in the future. On December 24 of the same year, Thomas Tien Ken-sin, the university chairman, was created cardinal. The following year, the School of Agriculture was added and preparations for the School of Medicine began. The university bought a freighter to travel between Tianjin, Shanghai and Keelung to increase revenue. Also in the same year, the first Taiwan Alumni Association of Fu Jen was established in Dadu, Taichung, Taiwan.

After the Communists assumed power in China in 1949, religious organisations, including the Catholic Church, began to be systematically repressed. In 1952 this intensified and the government merged Fu Jen with the Beijing Normal University, Peking University, Renmin University, China University of Political Science and Law, and Central University of Finance and Economics. Under Mao Zedong's arrangement, Chen Yuan, the former principal of Fu Jen, was transferred to the Normal University as the new principal.

Cold War era
Although the Taiwan Provincial Government promised to donate land near Yuanshan Area in Taipei in 1948 to serve as the school site for Fu Jen to move to Taiwan, the Roman headquarters of the Society of the Divine Word soon ordered the suspension of all activities. The following year, the university's American representative Rev. Ralph Thyken, S.V.D. came to Tokyo, Japan, to prepare for the establishment of a new Nagoya Catholic University, which is now Nanzan University. Until the Holy See formally ordered the re-establish in Taiwan, the history of Fu Jen was interrupted for about ten years.

Fu Jen Catholic University was re-established in 1961 in Taiwan, and Paul Yu Pin, the former Ordinary of Roman Catholic Archdiocese of Nanjing, was appointed as the new president by the  Pope John XXIII. The new school opened under the auspices of the Chinese Regional Bishops' Conference, the Society of Jesus, and the Society of the Divine Word.

The new Fu Jen's academics sprouted from Western history, medieval philosophy, Christian thought, and European languages. It is the only comprehensive university in Taiwan that fully integrates Western thought, history, language, religion, and art. Since the 1960s, the university's philosophical tradition has been Scholasticism and Paul Yu Pin's "Three Kinds of Knowing" (三知論), focusing on the development of a Catholic philosophy that incorporates Confucianism and opposing the "relativism hegemony."

During the thirty years of the Cold War, many Western priests and nuns were sent to teach at the university and imported advanced scholarship into Taiwan. Many professors have been commended for this in recent years, such as Daniel Ross from the United States, Leopoldo Vicente from Spain, Marcina Stawasz from Poland, etc.

Modern era

Fu Jen has expanded rapidly since the 1990s. The number of students and social influence has long maintained the top five in the country, and the number of colleges has been closely following the National Taiwan University. So far in the 21st century, the university has since grown to comprise twelve colleges and schools and a hospital. In 2001, Fu Jen has been the first college in Taiwan that actively reduces tuition and fees.

Fu Jen Catholic University Hospital was opened in September 2017. The College of Medicine can be used as a conduit for cooperation between different academic disciplines, and assume a leading role in bringing together the colleges of biotechnology, chemistry, physics, engineering, management, and foreign languages. The establishment of a completely new curriculum and unique program will include training in hospital management and medical translation, research in laser technology and biotechnology, integration of Western and Chinese medicine, and robotic surgery.

Ideal and governance
The university motto, 真、善、美、聖  (Veritas, Bonitas, Pulchritudo, Sanctitas in Latin), expresses four ideals: truth, goodness, beauty and sanctity

The laurel wreath symbolizes honor and peace while the twelve stars signify the Virgin Mary. The cross represents the Christian faith. The two colors on the shield suggest Christ's dual nature as the rounded shape of the shield recalls the Sacred Heart. The Latin words on the banner beneath the emblem, the university motto, express the four ideals of the university while the three folds of the banner suggest the Trinity.

Based on the Christian faith, the university president clearly supports the abolition of the death penalty, opposes abortion, and opposes the utilitarianization of higher education.

Impact 

Relying on the authority of the Vatican and the Society of the Divine Word, Fu Jen, then known as the Catholic University of Peking, was the only university in Beijing that was not taken over and controlled by Empire of Japan during the Second Sino-Japanese War. In the white terror period of the cold war, Fu Jen was able to prevent the Kuomintang fascist regime from interfering in school affairs and protect the students' freedom of speech under the serious concern of the Secretariat of State (Holy See).

Fu Jen Catholic University belongs to the International Federation of Catholic Universities (IFCU) under the United Nations Educational, Scientific and Cultural Organization (UNESCO). After the United Nations General Assembly Resolution 2758 came into effect in 1971, Fu Jen is the only university in Taiwan that has continuously participated in UNESCO for a long time. In the official Holy See–Taiwan relations, the university has repeatedly promoted substantial exchanges between the two countries. All the traditional Taiwanese ambassadors to the Holy See will be awarded an honorary doctorate degree from Fu Jen after leaving office. All the papal nuncio in Taiwan will also participate in the annual university opening ceremony.

The appointment and removal of the post of Fu Jen university president is a matter of inquiry by the Secretary of State of the Holy See, and has been compared with the membership of the United Nations of the Republic of China (Taiwan). The issue of the internal reorganization of Fu Jen has also widely affected the intervention of the Ministry of Education of the two countries and the papal nuncio to Taiwan.

The chairman or the president of the university has always accompanied the president of Taiwan to visit the Holy See. In 2005, under the intervention of Fu Jen, the seat of the Taiwanese president was placed in the first row of heads of state, ahead of the US Vice President Dick Cheney and German Chancellor Angela Merkel. In 2013, the university further designated the products of the Fu Jen alumni's enterprise Franz-porcelains as the official national gift, which were presented to the Pope Francis and the retired Pope Benedict XVI respectively.

Academics

The university at present comprises 12 colleges with more than 25,000 students. 

College of Liberal Arts
Department of Chinese Literature
Department of History
Department of Philosophy
College of Fine Arts
Department of Music
Department of Applied Arts
Department of Landscape Architecture (CH)
Bachelor's degree program of Art and Cultural Creation (CH)
College of Communication
Department of Communication Arts
Department of Journalism & Communication Studies
Department of Advertising & Public Relations
Graduate Institute of Mass Communication
College of Education
Department of Physical Education
Department of Library and Information Science
Graduate of Educational Leadership and Development
Program of Sport Recreation Management
College of Fashion and Textiles 
Department of Textiles and Clothing
Graduate Institute of Museum Studies
MA Program in Brand and Fashion Management
College of Medicine
School of Medicine
Department of Nursing
Department of Public Health
Department of Clinical Psychology
Department of Occupational Therapy
Department of Respiratory Therapy
Graduate Institute of Biomedical and Pharmaceutical Science
MS Program in Transdisciplinary Long Term Care
MS Program in Biomedical Big Data Analysis
Ph.D. Program in Pharmaceutical Biotechnology
College of Science and Engineering
Department of Mathematics
Department of Physics
Department of Chemistry
Department of Life Science
Department of Computer Science & Information Engineering
Department of Electrical Engineering (Electronic Engineering)
Bachelor's Program in Medical Informatics and Innovative Applications
Graduate Institute of Applied Science and Engineering
Bachelor Program in Software Engineering and Digital Innovation Application
College of Foreign Languages and Literatures
Department of English Language and Literature
Department of German Language and Culture
Department of French Language and Culture
Department of Spanish Language and Culture
Department of Japanese Language and Culture
Department of Italian Language and Culture
Graduate Institute of Cross-Cultural Studies
College of Human Ecology
Department of Child and Family Studies
Department of Restaurant, Hotel and Institutional Management
Department of Food Sciences
Department of Nutrition Science
Ph. D. Program in Nutrition and Food Science
School of Law
Department of Law
Department of Financial and Economic Law
Graduate Department of Law
College of Social Science
Department of Sociology
Department of Social Work
Department of Economics
Department of Religious Studies
Department of Psychology
Bachelor's Program in Catholic Studies
Master Program in Non-Profit Organization Management
College of Management
Department of Business Administration
Department of Accounting
Department of Statistics and Information Science
Department of Finance and International Business
Department of Information Management
Graduate Institute of Business Administration
MS Program of Technology Management
Master Program of Global Entrepreneurial Management
Master of Global Entrepreneurial Management (MGEM – FJU, IQS, and USF)
MBA Program in International Management (imMBA)
Master's Program in Social Enterprise
Bachelor's Program of Business Management

Teaching

Fu Jen University established Taiwan's first graduate-level program in conference interpreting, the Graduate Institute of Translation and Interpreting Studies (GITIS). Also Fu Jen has annexed a Mandarin Language Center, established in 1964 to address the need for foreign missionaries to learn Chinese teaching hundreds of students each semester from countries worldwide Taiwanese, and every semester offers cultural classes such as Chinese Poetry, Chinese calligraphy, and Taijiquan.

The School of Medicine is one of the medical schools in Taiwan to adopt the pedagogy, "problem-based learning (PBL)", first developed at McMaster University Medical School in Canada, so that students can acquire medical knowledge from small group discussions and case studies. The implementation of PBL has won applause from the Taiwan Medical Accreditation Council and brought a wave of reform in medical education in Taiwan. In order to successfully practice PBL, the School has recruited basic scientists with specialties in various areas as well as more than one hundred clinicians as a strong backbone for teaching. Fu Jen's is the only medical school in Taiwan which uses PBL as a pedagogy for the third and fourth year curriculum.

Research
Fu Jen Catholic University has a long history of publishing journals. The main journals are as follows:

Monumenta Serica
Universitas: Monthly Review of Philosophy and CultureA&HCI
Fu Jen Studies
Fu Jen Law Review
Fu Jen Journal of Chinese Literature
Journal of the Pre-Qin and Han Dynasties
Journal of The Graduate Institute Chinese Literature Department of Fu Jen Catholic University
Fu-Jen Journal of Medicine
Fu Jen Management Review
Fu Jen Journal of Foreign Languages
Fu Jen Historical Journal
Fu Jen Religious Studies
Journal of Physical Education Fu Jen Catholic University
Social Analysis

Fu Jen Academia Catholica was inaugurated on August 1, 2008, to enable interdisciplinary pursuits in Catholic studies. The Academia consists of five Fu Jen academic institutes or centers: the Institute of Scholastic Philosophy, Institutum Historiae Ecclesiae, Center for the Study of Science and Religion, Monumenta Serica Sinological Research Center, and John Paul II Institute for Research into Dialogue for Peace.

Globalization 
Fu Jen - Stanford
In September 2015, Fu Jen Catholic University has signed an agreement (MOU) to cooperate with Stanford Prevention Research Center, SPRC, promoted by Stanford University. The aim is to globally research the Wellness of humans.

Fu Jen - Oxford
In September 2012, Fu Jen Catholic University cooperated with the University of Oxford in the United Kingdom and the Pontifical University of Saint Thomas Aquinas in Italy and opened a new degree in philosophy and finance. The purpose is to emphasize the importance of the integrity for future Politicians and Financiers. The program combines the professional knowledge in finance and the idea in philosophy.

Fu Jen - IQS -USF
Master in Global Entrepreneurial Management (MGEM) is a joint-program offered by Fu Jen Catholic University, Ramon Llull University (IQS in Spain), and the University of San Francisco (USF in the US). It is ranked 43rd worldwide on the FT Masters in Management Rankings 2017.

Fu Jen - UC Berkeley
Professors from University of California, Berkeley, are constantly invited and hold lectures in Fu Jen Catholic University

Global Leadership Program with universities in Japan, Korea and Philippines
Since 2008, the Global Leadership Program was started for students from four Jesuit universities in East Asia: Sophia University in Japan, Sogang University in South Korea, Ateneo de Manila University in the Philippines and Fu Jen Catholic University in Taiwan.

Service-Learning Center
In 2015, Fu Jen Catholic University Service-Learning Center organised the 5th Asia-Pacific Regional Conference on Service-Learning.

Academic reputation

Fu Jen ranks at the top of Taiwan's private universities for top-ranked fields of study and distinguished alumni. The university has always been ranked in the QS World University Rankings and Times Higher Education World University Rankings, which is among the top 10% in the whole country. In addition, Fu Jen is the representative university of New Taipei City by QS Most Affordable Cities for Students Ranking. The Mayor of New Taipei City once pointed out in 2021 that "Fu Jen is the core of talent, academics and medical care in New Taipei City".

Fu Jen College of Management is one of the best business schools in Taiwan, with highly internationalization and powerful Amazon Web Services cloud computing teaching resources.

In 2014, the Embassy of Japan in Taiwan listed Fu Jen Catholic University as one of the seven well-known Taiwanese universities.

Taiwan's Most Popular University Ranking
According to a survey conducted by the electronic media DailyView in 2018, Fu Jen ranks 4th among 141 universities in Taiwan, and is also ranked 1st among private universities. In fact, the university is also the third-largest university in the country with the largest number of students.

World's Top Catholic Universities Ranking
According to 2021 uniRank Top Catholic Universities in the world, Fu Jen ranks 1st in Taiwan, 3rd in Asia, 54th worldwide among 610 univerties.

Times Higher Education Impact Ranking
In 2020, Fu Jen is ranked as 201st-300th by Times Higher Education Impact Ranking (5th nationally).

Times Higher Education Ranking
In 2020, Fu Jen is ranked top 1000 worldwide (10th nationally)  by Times Higher Education World University Rankings, and the citation rate of the paper is ranked 7th nationally.
In 2021, Fu Jen is ranked 168th in by Times Higher Education Asia University Rankings.

Global Entrepreneurial Management by Financial Times UK
In 2020, the cooperated Program "Master of Global Entrepreneurial Management" between Fu Jen, Instituto Químico de Sarriá Barcelona, IQS School of Management in Spain and University of San Francisco in the United States was ranked 19th globally by Financial Times, United Kingdom.

APQN Internal Quality Insurance Reward
In 2012, Fu Jen became a member of Asia-Pacific Quality Network, APQN. In 2013, Fu Jen has again passed the evaluation of the APQN International Conference Assessment. It was the only University, which was awarded in Taiwan.

AACSB Global Business Accreditation
In April 2005, Fu Jen obtained the most authorized certification of business school and MBA degree from AACSB. Only five universities in Taiwan obtained the certification.

IFT International Certification
The Department of Food Science at Fu Jen Catholic University was reviewed by the Higher Education Review Board (HERB) of the Institute of Food Technologists (IFT), and successfully obtained the IFT International Certification. It also became the first in Taiwan to obtain IFT Certified academic unit.

Campus

The campus of Fu Jen Catholic University (including the University Hospital) is 348,360 square meters, the size is close to the Vatican City State, Japan's Kyushu Imperial University Hakozaki Campus, and the world-renowned Osaka University Toyonaka Campus.

Fu Jen's Xinzhuang campus is known as "tree house campus".
Before 1951: Dingfu Street, Xicheng District, Beijing (today Beijing Normal University north campus and CPCA building). It is located in Shichahai area in central Beijing and surrounded by ancient Hutong. The Prince Kung's Mansion used to be part of Fu Jen's campus.
After the 1960s: 
Main campus: Xinzhuang District, New Taipei (1963–present)
2nd campus: Daan District, Taipei (1961-2011, today Chinese Regional Bishops' Conference building)

Libraries
Kungpo Memorial Library (Library for College of Literature)
Schutte Memorial Library (Library for College of Engineering; abolished)
Fahy Memorial Library (General Library)
Paul Cardinal Shan Library (Library for College of Medicine)
Theology Library

Transportation

Student life
The Ceremony of Venerating the Heavens and Ancestors was held for the first time since Cardinal Paul Yu Pin in 1979, advocating gratitude to nature and thinking of ancestors. Freshmen from the Department of Chinese Literature will sing a section of Classic of Poetry in the ceremony.

Student groups
Fu Jen Catholic University currently has more than 100 student clubs, divided into 6 categories: academic, artistic, service, leisure and social, physical clubs, and musical clubs.

The Cyan Rhyme Award was founded in 1977, it is an annual singing and song composition competition. Many well-known singers and artists have participated in the competition when they were studying at Fu Jen, such as Jolin Tsai, F.I.R. and so on.

Religious tradition

Every year during the Catholic Lent, a two-week Religious Life Week is held to trigger the whole school to reorganize the hearts of teachers and students to understand the meaning of Catholic Holy Week and Easter. In October, the university priests hold the Pray for the Country Mass in the university chapel, praying for God's protection and blessing to the country, government officials, all the people and world peace.

During the martial law period, only Fu Jen and Tunghai University held College Christmas Balls in Taiwan, which is known as "the Fu Jen in the North, the Tunghai in the South." This makes them the representative college Christmas ball in Taiwan.

Democratic tradition
Fu Jen professors and students are first initiators and enthusiastic participants for many famous student movements in the history of Taiwan and China, such as the May Fourth Movement, the December 9th Movement, the Consciousness Movement, the Wild Lily student movement, the Reconciliation Movement of the Case of Su Chien-ho, the Losheng Sanatorium Retention Movement, and the Wild Strawberry Movement. At the end of Taiwan's martial law, the Fu Jen student once published the underground publication Reform, which was the first demonstration of democratic activities on campus in Taiwan, but it was quickly banned.

In May of each year, Fu Jen regularly holds elections of student self-government organizations at all levels of the school (the president of the student union, members of the student council, representatives of all levels of university meetings, etc.) to implement student autonomy and democratic political education. Electronic voting was used for the first time in 2013 to enhance the convenience of student participation.

Athletics
Fu Jen Catholic University has at least 31 school-level sports teams. The Fu Jen baseball team is the most famous university baseball team in Taiwan, it has created the reputation of "Taiwan's Sokei-sen". The Fu Jen Dragon Boat Team is the first international university dragon boat team in Taiwan and an important role in national sports diplomacy.

Fu Jen is also the only university in Taiwan that has a men's football team and a women's football team. It not only participates in the University Football Association, but also has the qualifications for the Taiwan Football Premier League and the Taiwan Mulan Football League. Several students have represented Taiwan to play in the AFC Cup.

Fu Jen has always been the cradle of East Asian professional baseball and professional basketball stars. Among other sports, Lee Fu-an (twice champion at the Asian Athletics Championships), Cheng Chao-tsun (2017 Summer Universiade Javelin gold medal, breaking Asian record), Kuo Hsing-chun (2020 Summer Olympics & 2017 Summer Universiade weightlifting gold medal), Lin Yun-Ju (2020 Summer Olympics bronze medal, Taiwan's youngest player in the World Table Tennis Championships) are all alumni or students of the university. In recent years, Fu Jen has consecutively ranked first among private schools in the National Intercollegiate Athletic Games in 2016, 2017 and 2018.

2020 Summer Olympics
Fu Jen sent 8 athletes to participate in the 2020 Tokyo Olympics, and a total of 4 people won 3 medals for the Taiwanese team. Including the sixth gold medal in Taiwan's Olympic history.

Notable alumni

Fu Jen alumni number near 200,000, they work in various fields. Alumni working in political fields include at least 25 congressman in Legislative Yuan, 3 Taiwanese Justices of Constitutional Court, 3 Taiwanese Premier/Vice-Premier, 2 Taiwanese Minister/Deputy-Minister of National Defense, a large number of Taiwanese diplomats, mayors and magistratea, and former Chinese first lady Wang Guangmei.

Notable alumni of academia are Wei-min Hao, climate scientist and contributor to the IPCC (shared the 2007 Nobel Peace Prize), Harvard professor Lee-Jen Wei, notable physicist Lee C. Teng. In addition, there are also alumni working at Yale, Stanford, Columbia, Cornell, Georgetown, Northwestern, UCLA, USU, Howard University, Nanzan University, and National Taiwan University, etc. So far, many academicians and university presidents/vice-presidents such as Tsinghua's Liu Da, Texas A&M's Yang, Fu Jen's Bernard Li, NTPU's Hou Chong-wen, NDHU's Chin-Peng Chu, NUK's Yueh-Tuan Chen, NKUHT's Chi-Yeh Yung, FCU's Pao-Long Chang, Shih Hsin's Ting-ming Lai, Chia Nan's Suen-Zone Lee, and 3 presidents of Providence University all have graduated from Fu Jen Catholic University. Among the humanities scholars, such as the former director of National Palace Museum, Chou Kung-shin, Austrian scholar Leopold Leeb, and the historian Sheng-Ching Chang have an international reputation.

In the field of business, in addition to the famous "red capitalist" Wang Guangying, the Tsai family of the LinYuan Group, the world's top 100 richest enterprises, and the Taiwanese billionaire Wu family of Shin Kong Group, all have several people graduated from Fu Jen, such as Taishin International Bank chairman Thomas Wu, Shinkong Insurance CEO Peter Wu, Cathay Real Estate Development Co. CEO Tsai Chen-hung, COTC president Thomas Tsai. There are also world-renowned companies related to Fu Jen alumni, such as Trend Micro co-founder Steve Chang, Acer Inc. co-founder Carolyn Yeh, Acer Inc. board member Maverick Shih, Motech co-founder Cheng Fu-Tien and Simon Y.H. Tsuo, Franz-porcelains founder Franz Chen, and the "IKEA of Taiwan" Test Rite International Co. co-founder Tony Ho. Among the alumni of the Fu Jen Department of Economics, Peter Lo founded the world's third largest health equipment company Johnson Health Tech, and Charles C.Y. Chen is a member of the  world's 11th largest shipping company- Wan Hai Lines and the chairman of Epistar Optoelectronics.

The university has also produced many writers, celebrities, and other figures in the worlds of arts, media, and culture, and has had a huge influence in Taiwan and the Chinese speaking world over the past century. Internationally renowned figures include the 2018 Man Booker International Prize nomination novelist Wu Mingyi, 2009 Orwell Prize winner Hsiao-Hung Pai, poet Lin Yang-min, writer Chang Ta-chun, and many directors and actors such as Stan Lai, Wu Nien-jen, Terry Hu, Jolin Tsai, Nicky Wu, Reen Yu, and Vivian Sung. At the intersection of media and politics, former deputy spokesperson for the Taipei City Government Huang Ching-yin is also an alumna of the university.

Notable honorary doctorates
Fu Jen Catholic University has a special international status and plays a role in Taiwan's diplomatic status. The university has repeatedly awarded honorary doctorates to cardinals, national leaders and Nobel Prize winners.

Traditionally, the Ambassador of the R.O.C. (Taiwan) to the Holy See can earn an honorary doctorate from Fu Jen after retiring.

Affiliated schools
Keelung Fu Jen Sacred Heart Senior High School, Keelung City, Taiwan
Keelung Fu Jen Sacred Heart Elementary School, Keelung City, Taiwan

Controversy 
In 2016, Fu Jen University was accused of pressuring students to remain silent on sexual assault cases and for covering up an incident of rape in 2015. Following the accusation, the university issued an apology later in 2016.

Partner institution

Founder and church
Order of Saint Benedict (Beijing period)
Roman Catholicism in Taiwan
Republic of China–Holy See relations

Alliance
EUTW university alliance
Tsinghua Big Five Alliance
Excellent Long-Established University Consortium of Taiwan

See also

Hang Yuen FC
Instruction in Latin#Curriculum requirements in Asia
List of Jesuit educational institutions
List of Jesuit sites
List of schools of landscape architecture
List of university and college schools of music
List of fashion education programs

References

External links

Official website
Fu Jen University School Corporation
A History of Fu Jen Catholic University :: Divine Word Missionaries
Fu Jen University Foundation
Fu Jen University Press
An Introduction to Fu Jen Catholic University at YouTube.com
Taiwan Study (I): Welcome to Fu Jen University at YouTube.com

 
Universities and colleges in New Taipei
Educational institutions established in 1961
Divine Word Missionaries Order
Jesuit universities and colleges
Association of Christian Universities and Colleges in Asia
1961 establishments in Taiwan
Universities and colleges in Taiwan
Comprehensive universities in Taiwan